The  is a Japanese railway line operated by Hokkaido Railway Company (JR Hokkaido) in Hokkaido. The line connects Asahikawa Station in Asahikawa and Wakkanai Station in Wakkanai, and is the northernmost railway line in Japan. The name comes from Sōya Subprefecture.

On 19 November 2016, JR Hokkaido's President announced plans to rationalise the network by up to 1,237 km, or ~50% of the current network, including proposed conversion of the Nayoro - Wakkanai section of the Soya Line to Third Sector operation, but if local governments are not agreeable, the section will face closure.

Services

All-stations "Local" train services operate between Nayoro and Wakkanai, at approximately 3 to 4 hour intervals. Four Rapid Nayoro services operate between Nayoro and Asahikawa in each direction daily.

Stations
L: Limited Express ( Sōya / Sarobetsu )
R: All Rapid Nayoro services
r: Some Rapid Nayoro services
-: Some local trains skip marked stations

Northern extremity:  Wakkanai

Closed stations 

 Ashikawa, Kami-onoppunai and Shimo-nakagawa: Since 1 July 2001
  and Minami-shimonuma: Since 18 March 2006
 W39 , W50 , W71 , W41 , W35 , W53 , W33 , W56 , W43 , W75 , W58  and W69 : Since 13 March 2021, of which Toyoshimizu is downgraded to a signal base
 W65 : Since 12 March 2022

History
The line was originally built as part of a link between mainland Japan and the then Japanese northern frontier of Karafuto (southern half of Sakhalin Island). From Wakkanai Port, a ferry to then Ōdomari (present Korsakov) operated until the end of World War II.

The first segment of the line from Asahigawa (present Asahikawa) to Nagayama was built by the Hokkaido Government Railway in 1898. The line was extended to Nayoro in 1903, and to Wakkanai in 1922 along the route of the later Tempoku Line (Tenpoku-sen) via Hamatombetsu. The present route via  was opened as part of the Teshio Line (Teshio-sen).

After Japan's defeat in the war, the line lost its function as a link to Sakhalin, but remained important as a trunk line into the northern part of Hokkaido. The Sōya Main Line gradually lost all of its branch lines, and presently constitutes a long branch from the Hakodate Main Line.

Timeline
November 25, 1898: Extended to Ranru
November 15, 1899: Extended to Wassamu
August 5, 1900: Extended to Shibetsu
September 3, 1900: Extended to Nayoro
April 1, 1905: Transferred to Imperial Japanese Government Railways
November 3, 1911: Extended to Onnenai
September 21, 1912: Renamed 
November 5, 1912: Extended to Otoineppu
October 20, 1919: Renamed 
October 5, 1921: Renamed Sōya Line
November 1, 1922: Completed to Wakkanai (present Minami-Wakkanai) via later Tempoku Line
November 4, 1922: Renamed back to Sōya Main Line
November 8, 1922: Teshio Line (II) between Otoineppu and Pompira (present Teshio-Nakagawa)
May 1, 1923:  commenced Wakkanai - Ōdomari
November 10, 1923: Extended to Toikambetsu
June 25, 1924:  opened Wakkanai - Kabutonuma. Teshio Line renamed 
July 20, 1925: Teshio South Line extended to Horonobe
December 26, 1928: Extended to Wakkanaikō (present Wakkanai).
April 1, 1930: Entire stretch of the Teshio Line became a part of Sōya Main Line.
June 30, 1935: Teshio Line (III), later  from Horonobe opened.
August 25, 1945: Chihaku Ferry ceased operation when all of Sakhalin becomes part of the Soviet Union.
July 15, 1965: The 1256m Shimodaira Tunnel and realignment opened to avoid an avalanche trouble-spot.
November 10, 1984: Automated block system introduced, ticketing of most (29) stations unstaffed
November 1, 1986: CTC implemented, above noted stations completely unstaffed.
April 1, 1987: Japanese National Railways privatized, Hokkaido Railway Company succeeded the entire line as Category 1, Japan Freight Railway Company as Category 2 between Asahikawa and Nayoro. All the temporary stations were reclassified as regular stations
1995: The ferry between Wakkanai and Korsakov "resumed" after 50 years, although not directly connected to the railway.
March 2000: Tracks of Asahikawa - Nayoro upgraded for faster operation. The Super Sōya limited express train commenced.

Former connecting lines

 Shibetsu station - A 762mm (2'6") gauge line was constructed between 1920-25 along the Teshio River valley to transport forestry products, extending 21.4 km to 'Upper' Shibetsu, where it connected to the Shibetsu Forest Railway. Initially horse drawn, a steam locomotive was introduced in 1928. The line closed in 1959.
 Nayoro station - A 138 km line known as the Nayoro Main Line was built from Nayoro to Engaru on the Sekihoku Main Line between 1915-1921, operating until 1989. There were four lines connecting to the Nayoro Main line:
 The 20 km Kohin'nan line from Okoppe to Om, operated from 1935-85. Some construction work on a proposed extension to Kitami Esashi (see below) was undertaken before the proposal was abandoned.
 The 34 km line from Shokotsu to Kitami Takinoue, opened 1923 and closed 1985.
 The 28 km 762mm gauge line from Monbetsu to Motoyama, which operated from 1943–73
 The 6 km 762mm gauge line from Yubetsu to Saromako, which operated from 1930–39
A substantial steel truss bridge was constructed before work was abandoned in 1962.
 Bifuka station - A 21 km 762mm gauge line was built to Niupu in 1935. In 1960 it was decided to replace the line with a 1067mm gauge line and extend it 58 km to Kitami Esashi, the terminus of a line from Hamatonbetsu on the Tempoku line (see below). The 762mm gauge line closed in 1963 and the 1067mm line opened in 1964. Substantial construction of the line to Kitami Esashi continued until abandoned in 1979, after 13.3 Billion Yen had been expended. The Bifuka - Niupu section closed in 1985.
 Otoineppu station - The Tempoku line was constructed north commencing in 1914, reaching Minami-Wakkanai in 1922. It closed in 1989. This line had the Hamatonbetsu - Kitami Esashi branch line operating from 1936 until 1985. The Utanobori Municipal Tramway was a network of 762mm gauge lines, with a 16.2 km line from Shotonbetsu to Kitami Esashi and 2 branch lines, each 10 km long. It operated 1929-70, being horse drawn until 1933.
 Toyotomi station - The Nisso Coal Co. operated an 18 km line to Sanko from 1940/45 until the mine closed in 1972.
 Toikanbetsu station - The Horonobe Municipal Tramway was a 16 km 762mm gauge line to Kamitoikan, which operated 1930-71. It was extended 4 km to a coal mine in 1941, at which time a steam locomotive was introduced. The coal mine and extension closed in 1958.
 Horonobe station - The initial northern section of the  opened in 1935. The initial southern section from Rumoi opened in 1927, and the sections were linked in 1958. The line closed in 1987.

See also
List of railway lines in Japan

References

 
Rail transport in Hokkaido
Lines of Hokkaido Railway Company
1067 mm gauge railways in Japan
Railway lines opened in 1898